Kapitolina Alexeevna Rumiantseva (December 16, 1925 in Leningrad, USSR – August 8, 2002 in Saint Petersburg, Russian Federation) was a Russian Soviet realist painter and graphic artist, who lived and worked in Saint Petersburg (formerly Leningrad). She was a member of the Saint Petersburg Union of Artists (before 1992 named as the Leningrad branch of Union of Artists of Russian Federation), regarded as one of representatives of the Leningrad school of painting, most famous for her still life paintings.

Biography 
Kapitolina Alexeevna Rumiantseva was born December 16, 1925, in the Leningrad.

In 1945, Kapitolina Rumiantseva entered at the Tavricheskaya Art School, where she studied of George Shakh, Dina Rezanskaya, Valentina Petrova, and Mikhail Shuvaev. She graduated Art School in 1950.

After graduation, in 1950–1969 years Kapitolina Rumiantseva taught drawing and painting in secondary art school. Since 1970, Kapitolina Rumiantseva has participated in Art Exhibitions. She painted landscapes, still lifes, genre scenes, sketches from the life. Most famous for her sensual still lifes with wildlife flowers and fruits in interior and exterior.

Her painting style evolved in the direction to decorative and local color while maintaining interest to the object, for transfer of its texture and material tangibility. Her images invariably filled with lyricism and poetic sound.

In 1973 Kapitolina Rumiantseva was admitted to the Leningrad Union of Artists (since 1992 known as the Saint Petersburg Union of Artists).

At the beginning of 1990 her works were at expositions of some exhibitions abroad with other Leningrad artists[][][].

Kapitolina Alexeevna Rumiantseva died in Saint Petersburg in 2002. Her paintings reside in museums and private collections in Russia, France, Korea, in the U.S., England, Germany, China, Italy, and others.
 
Her style of painting developed to the intensification of ornamentality nevertheless without loss of an interest to the object with its touchableness. Her images are lyrical and very poetical.
She is an author of paintings: «Stil life with Fruits» (1965)[], «Stil life with Melon»[] (1968), «Stil life with White Cup»[] (1969), «Irises»[] (1970), «Stil life with Orange», «Peones»[] (1971), «Dream»[], «Elder»[] (both 1972), «Stil life with Apple Tree Branches»[] (1973), «In the Garden at Early Spring», «Cloudy Day», «Натюрморт с рыбами»[] (all 1974), «After the Rain»[] (1980), «Autumn in Ozerki» (1985), «Autumn» (1987)[], «Peones»[] (1990), «Lilac»[] (1991) and others.

See also
 Leningrad School of Painting
 List of Russian artists
 List of 20th-century Russian painters
 List of painters of Saint Petersburg Union of Artists
 Saint Petersburg Union of Artists

References

Further reading 
 Осенняя выставка произведений ленинградских художников 1970 года. Л., Художник РСФСР, 1972.
 Наш современник. Вторая выставка произведений ленинградских художников 1972 года. Каталог. Л., Художник РСФСР, 1973. С.6.
 Натюрморт. Выставка произведений ленинградских художников 1973 года. Л., Художник РСФСР, 1973. С.8.
 Весенняя выставка произведений ленинградских художников. Каталог. Л., Художник РСФСР, 1974. С.10.
 Наш современник. Зональная выставка произведений ленинградских художников 1975 года. Каталог. Л., Художник РСФСР, 1980. С.13. 
 Выставка произведений художников — женщин Ленинграда 1975 года. Каталог. Л., Художник РСФСР, 1979. С.4.
 Зональная выставка произведений ленинградских художников 1980 года. Каталог. Л., Художник РСФСР, 1983. С.11.
 Справочник членов Ленинградской организации Союза художников РСФСР. Л., Художник РСФСР, 1987. С.113.
 Peinture Russe. Catalogue. Paris, Drouot Richelieu, 24 Septembre 1991. P.29-30.
 Sots’Art a St Petersbourg. Catalogue. St Germain en Laye, 23 Fevrier 1992. P.3.
 Ecole de Saint-Petersbourg. Catalogue. Paris, Drouot Richelieu, 27 Janvier, 1992.
 Ecole de Saint-Petersbourg. Catalogue. Paris, Drouot Richelieu, 13 Mars, 1992.
 Peintures Russes. Catalogue. Bruxelles, Palais Des Beaux-Arts, 17 Fevrier, 1993. 
 Ленинградские художники. Живопись 1950—1980 годов. Каталог. СПБ., 1994. С.6.
 Этюд в творчестве ленинградских художников. Выставка произведений. Каталог. СПб., Мемориальный музей Н. А. Некрасова, 1994. С.6.
 Лирика в произведениях художников военного поколения. Выставка произведений. Каталог. СПб., Мемориальный музей Н. А. Некрасова, 1995. С.6.
 Живопись 1940—1990 годов. Ленинградская школа. Выставка произведений. СПб., Мемориальный музей Н. А. Некрасова, 1996. С.4.
 Натюрморт в живописи 1940—1990 годов. Ленинградская школа. Каталог выставки. СПб., Мемориальный музей Н. А. Некрасова, 1997. С.4. 
 Связь времён. 1932—1997. Художники — члены Санкт-Петербургского Союза художников России. Каталог выставки. СПб., ЦВЗ «Манеж», 1997. С.297.
 Sergei V. Ivanov. Unknown Socialist Realism. The Leningrad School. Saint Petersburg, NP-Print Edition, 2007. P.154, 222, 236, 259, 368, 396-398, 404, 405, 419, 423. , .

1925 births
2002 deaths
20th-century Russian painters
21st-century Russian painters
Soviet painters
Socialist realist artists
Leningrad School artists
Tavricheskaya Art School alumni
Russian women painters
Members of the Leningrad Union of Artists
20th-century Russian women artists
21st-century Russian women artists